Acrolophus leucotricha is a moth of the family Acrolophidae. It is found in Paraguay.

References

Moths described in 1931
Taxa named by Edward Meyrick
leucotricha